Norway Baptist Church is a historic former Baptist church at 1067 Newport-Gray Road in Norway, Herkimer County, New York.  It was built in 1830-1831 and is a rectangular, two story, gable roofed, vernacular Federal building.  It features an engaged, two stage bell tower.

It was listed on the National Register of Historic Places in 2007.

References

Baptist churches in New York (state)
Churches on the National Register of Historic Places in New York (state)
Federal architecture in New York (state)
Churches completed in 1831
Former churches in New York (state)
Closed churches in New York (state)
Churches in Herkimer County, New York
1831 establishments in New York (state)
National Register of Historic Places in Herkimer County, New York